Circle is a type of administrative division of some countries. In Thailand the former monthon are translated as circle. The former Holy Roman Empire was organized into Imperial Circles (German: Reichskreise). Algerian daïras are circles.

See also 
 Cercles of Mali
 Cercle (French colonial)
 Kreis, Districts of Prussia
 Kreis, Districts of Germany

Types of administrative division